is a railway station in the city of  Shinshiro, Aichi Prefecture, Japan, operated by Central Japan Railway Company (JR Tōkai).

Lines
Ikeba Station is served by the Iida Line, and is located 50.1 kilometers from the starting point of the line at Toyohashi Station.

Station layout
The station has one side platform serving a single bi-directional track. There is no station building, but only a small shelter on the platform. The station is unattended.

Adjacent stations

|-
!colspan=5|Central Japan Railway Company

Station history
On August 1, 1943, the Sanshin Railway was nationalized along with several other local lines to form the Iida Line. On December 1, 1946, it was elevated to a full station and renamed to its present name. Along with its division and privatization of JNR on April 1, 1987, the station came under the control and operation of the Central Japan Railway Company.

Surrounding area
Japan National Route 151

See also
 List of Railway Stations in Japan

References

External links

Railway stations in Japan opened in 1946
Railway stations in Aichi Prefecture
Iida Line
Stations of Central Japan Railway Company
Shinshiro, Aichi